Kudur-Mabuk was a ruler in the ancient Near East city-state 
of Larsa from 1770 BC to 1754 BC. His sons Warad-Sin and
Rim-Sin I were kings of Larsa. His daughter En-ane-du was high 
priestess of the moon god in Ur.

See also

Chronology of the ancient Near East
Kings of Larsa

Notes

18th-century BC Sumerian kings
Kings of Larsa
18th-century BC people